Cassius Clay (later "Muhammad Ali") fought an eight-round boxing match with Texan Donnie Fleeman in Miami on February 21, 1961. Prior to this fight, Fleeman had a record of 51 fights with 45 wins including 20 knockouts. Clay won the bout through a technical knockout after the referee stopped the fight in the seventh round. This was the first time Clay had gone over six rounds in a boxing match. It was also the first time Fleeman had ever been knocked down in a boxing match. Fleeman retired from boxing after this fight.

Background
Before this fight, Fleeman had fought with Ezzard Charles and Sonny Liston in boxing matches, winning against Charles, and losing to Liston. Of his encounter with Liston, Fleeman later recalled that he had gone backstage waiting for his fight when he noticed a huge man sitting next to him.

Prior to the Clay–Fleeman bout, it was held that Fleeman's experience and durability gave him an edge over Clay.

Buildup
Fleeman had injured himself in his previous boxing match. Nevertheless, the guaranteed prize money for the Clay–Fleeman fight was an offer he could not refuse, particularly after his wife encouraged him to go on with the fight since they needed the money. Fleeman later explained:

In interviews with the local newspapers Clay stated that "I plan to be heavyweight champion someday. If I can't beat this fellow, I ought to change my plans." As was his usual practice before almost every Clay/Ali fight, Angelo Dundee announced that Clay would face his toughest test in the upcoming fight.

The fight
Although Fleeman was extremely durable and tough, Clay's speed overwhelmed the Texan in the fight.

Fleeman was able to absorb Clay's punches during the bout, and would have probably gone the full distance, but for the fact that he was badly cut around both his eyes, and his nose had started bleeding, due to which the referee stopped the fight in the seventh round.

Reflecting on the fight, Fleeman observed that Clay's arms were long and fast, and that he had felt as if he was a punching bag. Fleeman would also note that, despite the injury he had carried into the fight,

Aftermath
After the fight, Clay struck a Tarzan of the Apes pose in the dressing room and, with clenched fists and glaring eyes, intoned, "He had to go." Clay then noticed a reporter he had met in Rome in 1960 who had witnessed Clay's bout with Zbigniew Pietrzykowski for the Olympic Light Heavyweight Championship. Clay told the reporter: "Hey, write about me. You ain't wrote about me since Rome."

Angelo Dundee brought some literary figures to interact with Clay after the boxer had taken a shower. Dundee later recalled what happened next:

Long after Fleeman's retirement from boxing, the writer Jon McConal tracked him down and visited him at his home in Ellis County. McConal noted that at this time Fleeman was "still lean and looked like a fighter despite being in his late sixties." However, at the time he died aged 80, Fleeman was suffering from Alzheimer's disease, and also from what Clay/Ali developed in latter years, Parkinson's disease.

References

Fleeman
1961 in boxing
Sports in Miami
February 1961 sports events in the United States
1961 in sports in Florida